Overseas Ministry may refer to:

 Overseas Ministry (Portugal)
 Overseas Ministry (Spain)
 Ministry of the Overseas (France)